Pokhran is a village and a municipality located, outside of Jaisalmer city in the Jaisalmer district of the Indian state of Rajasthan. It is a remote location in the Thar Desert region and served as the site for India's first underground nuclear weapon test.

Member of the Legislative Assembly is Saleh Mohammad

Geography 
Surrounded by rocks, sand and five salt ranges, its Hindi name "Pokhran" (पोखरण) means "five salt-ranges".

History

Fort Pokhran 
Fort Pokhran, the 14th century citadel also known as "Balagarh", stands amidst the Thar Desert. This monument is the premier fort of the chief of the Champawats, one of the clan of Rathores of the state of Marwar-Jodhpur. Fort Pokhran is open for visitors and is being currently run as heritage hotel by the royal family of Pokhran.

Sati Mata Memorial 
On the outskirts of the town, the Satiyo Deval Sati Mata Memorial, a royal cenotaph, is freely accessible.

The famous, touristic city and fort of Jaisalmer is a couple of hours away by road.

Former rulers 
 Seat of Chief of the Champawats, a sub-clan of Rathores of the state of Marwar-Jodhpur.
 Bhawani Singh of Pokhran (b. 1911) was the last jagirdar of Pokhran before Indian independence. He was Sessions Judge and was elected to the 1st Lok Sabha, the Lower house of Indian parliament from Barmer-Jalore constituency, after getting elected as an Independent candidate in the 1952 Indian general election.

Demographics 
According to 2011 Indian census, Pokhran had a population of 28457. Males constitute 55% of the population and females 45%. Pokhran has an average literacy rate of 56%, lower than the national average of 74.0%: male literacy is 68%, and female literacy is 41%. In Pokhran, 19% of the population is under 6 years of age.

Pokhran Nuclear Test Range 

The Pokhran Test Range, a key component of India's nuclear programme, is located in the municipality. The Indian Nuclear Test Site is located 45 km north-west of Pokhran town and 4 km north of Khetolai village. The test range was built by the Indian Army Corps of Engineers and is under the control of Indian Army. It was built sometime before May 1974, when, following authorization given to the Bhabha Atomic Research Centre by then-Prime Minister Indira Gandhi, it hosted the detonation of India's first nuclear device.

Pokhran-I

The Ministry of External Affairs designated the test "Pokhran-I", but it is also known as "Smiling Buddha". It was India's first successful nuclear bomb test on 18 May 1974. The bomb was detonated on the army base Pokhran Test Range (PTR), in Rajasthan, by the Indian Army under the supervision of several key Indian generals.

Pokhran-II

On 11 and 13 May 1998, twenty-four years after Pokhran-I, the Indian Defence Research and Development Organisation (DRDO) and Atomic Energy Commission (AEC) conducted five further nuclear tests, dubbed "Pokhran-II", at the Pokhran range. Four AEC devices and, under the codename Shakti, a thermonuclear device were tested.

See also 
Bhaniyana
Jajwala Mata Temple
Parmanu: The Story of Pokhran – a 2018 Bollywood movie.

References 

Cities and towns in Jaisalmer district
Nuclear test sites
Indian nuclear test sites